The Roper Highway is a road in the Northern Territory of Australia that begins from a point on the Stuart Highway 7 kilometres south of Mataranka, and runs east along the Roper River via Roper Bar to Ngukurr. Its length is 206 kilometres. From Ngukurr the road continues for approximately 153 kilometres to Numbulwar on the Gulf of Carpentaria as the Numbulwar Road. The section of the highway between Roper Bar and Ngukurr is also known as the Ngukurr Access.

See also

 Highways in Australia
 List of highways in the Northern Territory

References

Highways in the Northern Territory